A megacity is a very large city, typically with a population of more than 10 million people. Precise definitions vary: the United Nations Department of Economic and Social Affairs in its 2018 "World Urbanization Prospects" report counted urban agglomerations having over 10 million inhabitants. A University of Bonn report held that they are "usually defined as metropolitan areas with a total population of 10 million or more people". Others list cities satisfying criteria of either 5 or 8 million and also having a population density of 2,000 per square kilometre. The terms conurbation, metropolis, and metroplex are also applied to the latter.

The total number of megacities in the world varies between different sources: The world had 33 according to the UN (in 2018), 37 according to CityPopulation.de (in 2020), and 44 according to Demographia (in 2022). About half these urban agglomerations are in China and India. The other four countries with more than one megacity are Brazil, Japan, Pakistan, and the United States. African megacities are present in Nigeria, Egypt, South Africa, and the DRC; European megacities are present in Russia, France, the United Kingdom, and Turkey (also in Asia); megacities can be found in Latin America in the countries of Brazil, Mexico, Colombia, Peru, and Argentina. Some sources identify Tokyo's Greater Tokyo Area as the largest megacity in the world, while some others give the title to Pearl River Delta.

List of megacities

History
The term "megacity" entered common use in the late 19th or early 20th centuries; one of the earliest documented uses of the term was by the University of Texas in 1904. Initially the United Nations used the term to describe cities of 8 million or more inhabitants, but now uses the threshold of 10 million. In the mid 1970s the term was coined by urbanist Janice Perlman referring to the phenomenon of very large urban agglomerations. 
 
In 1800, only 3% of the world's population lived in cities, a figure that rose to 47% by the end of the twentieth century. In 1950, there were 83 cities with populations exceeding one million; by 2007, this number had risen to 468. The UN forecasts that today's urban population of 3.2 billion will rise to nearly 5 billion by 2030, when three out of five, or sixty percent, of people will live in cities.
This increase will be most dramatic on the least-urbanized continents, Asia and Africa. Surveys and projections indicate that all urban growth over the next 25 years will be in developing countries. One billion people, almost one-seventh of the world's population, now live in shanty towns. In many poor countries, overcrowded slums exhibit high rates of disease due to unsanitary conditions, malnutrition, and lack of basic health care. By 2030, over 2 billion people in the world will be living in slums. Over 90% of the urban population of Ethiopia, Malawi and Uganda, three of the world's most rural countries, already live in slums.

By 2025, Asia alone will have at least 30 megacities, including Mumbai, India (2015 population of 20.75 million people), Shanghai, China (2015 population of 35.5 million people), Delhi, India (2015 population of 21.8 million people), Tokyo, Japan (2015 population of 38.8 million people) and Seoul, South Korea (2015 population of 25.6 million people). In Africa, Lagos, Nigeria has grown from 300,000 in 1950 to an estimated 21 million today.

Growth

For almost five hundred years, Rome was the largest, wealthiest, and most politically important city in Europe. Its population passed one million people by the end of the 1st century BC. Rome's population started declining in 402 AD when Flavius Honorius, Western Roman Emperor from 395 to 423, moved the government to Ravenna and Rome's population declined to a mere 20,000 during the Early Middle Ages, reducing the sprawling city to groups of inhabited buildings interspersed among large areas of ruins and vegetation.

Baghdad was likely the largest city in the world from shortly after its foundation in 762 AD until the 930s, with some estimates putting its population at over one million. Chinese capital cities Chang'an and Kaifeng also experienced huge population booms during prosperous empires. According to the census in the year 742 recorded in the New Book of Tang, 362,921 families with 1,960,188 persons were counted in Jingzhao Fu (京兆府), the metropolitan area including small cities in the vicinity of Chang'an. The medieval settlement surrounding Angkor, the one-time capital of the Khmer Empire which flourished between the 9th and 15th centuries, could have supported a population of up to one million people.

From around 1825 to 1918 London was the largest city in the world, with the population growing rapidly; it was the first city to reach a population of over 5 million in 1900. In 1950, New York City was the only urban area with a population of over 10 million. Geographers had identified 25 such areas as of October 2005, as compared with 19 megacities in 2004 and only nine in 1985. This increase has happened as the world's population moves towards the high (75–85%) urbanization levels of North America and Western Europe.

Since the 2000s, the largest megacity has been the Greater Tokyo Area. The population of this urban agglomeration includes areas such as Yokohama and Kawasaki, and is estimated to be between 37 and 38 million. This variation in estimates can be accounted for by different definitions of what the area encompasses. While the prefectures of Tokyo, Chiba, Kanagawa, and Saitama are commonly included in statistical information, the Japan Statistics Bureau only includes the area within 50 kilometers of the Tokyo Metropolitan Government Offices in Shinjuku, thus arriving at a smaller population estimate. A characteristic issue of megacities is the difficulty in defining their outer limits and accurately estimating the populations.

Another list defines megacities as urban agglomerations instead of metropolitan areas. As of 2021, there are 28 megacities by this definition, like Tokyo. Other sources list Nagoya and the Rhein-Ruhr as megacities.

Challenges

Slums
According to the United Nations, the proportion of urban dwellers living in slums or informal settlements decreased from 47 percent to 37 percent in the developing world between 1990 and 2005. However, due to rising population, the absolute number of slum dwellers is rising. The majority of these are located in informal settlements which often lack sufficient quality housing, sanitation, drainage, water access, and officially recognized addresses. The increase in informal settlement population has been caused by massive migration, both internal and transnational, into cities, which has caused growth rates of urban populations and spatial concentrations not seen before in history. These issues raise problems in the political, social, and economic arenas. People who live in slums or informal settlements often have minimal or no access to education, healthcare, or the urban economy.

Crime
As with any large concentration of people, there is usually crime. High population densities often result in higher crime rates, as visibly seen in growing megacities such as Karachi, Delhi, Cairo, Rio de Janeiro, and Lagos.

Homelessness

Megacities often have significant numbers of homeless people. The actual legal definition of homelessness varies from country to country, or among different entities or institutions in the same country or region.

In 2002, research showed that children and families were the largest growing segment of the homeless population in the United States, and this has presented new challenges, especially in services, to agencies.

In the US, the government asked many major cities to come up with a ten-year plan to end homelessness. One of the results of this was a "Housing first" solution, rather than to have a homeless person remain in an emergency homeless shelter it was thought to be better to quickly get the person permanent housing of some sort and the necessary support services to sustain a new home. But there are many complications with this kind of program and these must be dealt with to make such an initiative work successfully in the middle to long term.

Traffic congestion

Traffic congestion is a condition on road networks that occurs as use increases, and is characterized by slower speeds, longer trip times, increased pollution, and increased vehicular queueing. The Texas Transportation Institute estimated that, in 2000, the 75 largest metropolitan areas experienced 3.6 billion vehicle-hours of delay, resulting in 5.7 billion U.S. gallons (21.6 billion liters) in wasted fuel and $67.5 billion in lost productivity, or about 0.7% of the nation's GDP. It also estimated that the annual cost of congestion for each driver was approximately $1,000 in very large cities and $200 in small cities. Traffic congestion is increasing in major cities and delays are becoming more frequent in smaller cities and rural areas.

Urban sprawl

Urban sprawl, also known as suburban sprawl, is a multifaceted concept, which includes the spreading outwards of a city and its suburbs to its outskirts to low-density, auto-dependent development on rural land, with associated design features that encourage car dependency. As a result, some critics argue that sprawl has certain disadvantages including longer transport distances to work, high car dependence, inadequate facilities (e.g. health, cultural. etc.) and higher per-person infrastructure costs. Discussions and debates about sprawl are often obfuscated by the ambiguity associated with the phrase. For example, some commentators measure sprawl only with the average number of residential units per acre in a given area. But others associate it with decentralization (spread of population without a well-defined center), discontinuity (leapfrog development), segregation of uses, etc.

Gentrification
Gentrification and urban gentrification are terms for the socio-cultural changes in an area as a result of wealthier people buying property in a less prosperous community. As living costs rise, lower-income residents are forced to move out of the community leading to an increase in average income, which in turn makes the area more desirable to other wealthier property or business owners, further pushing the living costs up. This process also tends to lead to a decrease in average family size in the area. This type of population change reduces industrial land use when it is redeveloped for commerce and housing.

Air pollution
Air pollution is the introduction into the atmosphere of chemicals, particulate matter, or biological materials that cause harm or discomfort to humans or other living organisms, or damages the natural environment. Many urban areas have significant problems with smog, a type of air pollution derived from vehicle emissions from internal combustion engines and industrial fumes that react in the atmosphere with sunlight to form secondary pollutants that also combine with the primary emissions to form photochemical smog.

Energy and material resources
The sheer size and complexity of megacities gives rise to enormous social and environmental challenges. Whether megacities can develop sustainably depends to a large extent on how they obtain, share, and manage their energy and material resources. There are correlations between electricity consumption, heating and industrial fuel use, ground transportation energy use, water consumption, waste generation, and steel production in terms of level of consumption and how efficiently they use resources.

In fiction

Megacities are a common backdrop in dystopian science fiction, with examples such as the Sprawl in William Gibson's Neuromancer, and Mega-City One, a megalopolis of between 50 and 800 million people (fluctuations due to war and disaster) across the east coast of the United States, in the Judge Dredd comic. In Demolition Man a megacity called "San Angeles" was formed from the joining of Los Angeles, Santa Barbara, San Diego and the surrounding metropolitan regions following a massive earthquake in 2010. Fictional planet-wide megacities (ecumenopoleis) include Trantor in Isaac Asimov's Foundation series of books and Coruscant (population 2 trillion) in the Star Wars universe.

See also 

Economies of agglomeration
Global city
List of largest cities
List of largest cities throughout history
Megalopolis
Urban sprawl

References 

Urban studies and planning terminology
Human habitats
Population
Types of cities
Cyberpunk themes